Philophlaeus is a genus of beetles in the family Carabidae, found in Australia and New Zealand. The genus contains the following species:

 Philophlaeus angulatus Chaudoir, 1869 
 Philophlaeus australasiae Chaudoir, 1869 
 Philophlaeus australis (Dejean, 1826) 
 Philophlaeus bivittatus Sloane, 1920 
 Philophlaeus brunnipennis W.J.Macleay, 1871 
 Philophlaeus confertus Blackburn, 1892 
 Philophlaeus discorufus Sloane, 1898 
 Philophlaeus distinguendus Chaudoir, 1869 
 Philophlaeus eucalypti Germar, 1848 
 Philophlaeus fuscipennis Germar, 1848 
 Philophlaeus immaculatus Chaudoir, 1869 
 Philophlaeus intermedius Chaudoir, 1869 
 Philophlaeus laticollis Blackburn, 1892 
 Philophlaeus luculentus (Newman, 1842) 
 Philophlaeus maculatus W.J.Macleay, 1871 
 Philophlaeus moestus (Chaudoir, 1869) 
 Philophlaeus monticola Blackburn, 1892 
 Philophlaeus myrmecophilus Lea, 1912 
 Philophlaeus obtusus Chaudoir, 1869 
 Philophlaeus occidentalis Blackburn, 1890 
 Philophlaeus opaciceps Blackburn, 1890 
 Philophlaeus ornatus Blackburn, 1892 
 Philophlaeus planus (Newman, 1840) 
 Philophlaeus puberulus Chaudoir, 1869 
 Philophlaeus pygmaeus Blackburn, 1892 
 Philophlaeus quadripennis Chaudoir, 1869 
 Philophlaeus rectangulus Chaudoir, 1869 
 Philophlaeus simsoni Sloane, 1920 
 Philophlaeus sydneyensis Blackburn, 1892 
 Philophlaeus unicolor Chaudoir, 1869 
 Philophlaeus vittatus W.J.Macleay, 1871

References

Lebiinae
Beetles of Australia
Beetles of New Zealand